Josep María Socías i Humbert (23 August 1937 – 3 November 2008) was a Spanish lawyer and politician.
He graduated from the University of Barcelona (UB) with a degree in law, and was named Mayor of Barcelona by King Juan Carlos I on 6 December 1976 .

References

1937 births
2008 deaths
Mayors of Barcelona City Council
University of Barcelona alumni